AntarChile is the main holding company of the Angelini Group of Companies, one of the largest conglomerates in South America. This company has major investments in various sectors like  industrial, forestry, fisheries and energy.

The origins of AntarChile back to the early 1950s, when arriving in Chile from Italy Gino and Anacleto Angelini brothers and begin to undertake various businesses. In 1956 set in motion Pesquera Eperva Company Ltd. in the Northern Zone, which marks the beginning of the formation of large industrial fishing complex is now a pillar in the regional economy and recognized world leader in its field.

In 1986, through Pesquera Eperva Company Ltd. and Pesquera Indo SA Company took control of Petroleos de Chile SA, today Copec 

In 1989 the companies split the operational management and investment, and create societies EMPD Investment SA Indomitable and Investment SA and, through them, retain control of the company Petroleos de Chile SA. Later, in 1994 these companies merged with other investment companies Angelini Group Companies, conforming AntarChile 

Its main objective is to conduct a wide range of investments, noting especially their participation in forest enterprises, manufacture of timber, fuel distribution, production and distribution of energy, shipping and fisheries.

References

Companies based in Santiago
Investment companies of Chile
2003 establishments in Chile
Companies listed on the Santiago Stock Exchange